Talant Samsaliev (Kyrgyz: Талант Самсалиев; born 27 April 1980) is a retired Kyrgyzstani International footballer who played the majority of his career for Dordoi Bishkek.

Career
On 21 October 2017, Samsaliev played his last professional match against Khimik Kara-Balta, during his time with Dordoi Bishkek he made 393 appearances and scored 23 goals in all competitions.

Career Stats

International

Statistics accurate as of match played 12 November 2015

International Goals

Honours

Club
Dordoi Bishkek
Kyrgyzstan League Winner (9): 2004, 2005, 2006, 2007, 2008, 2009, 2011, 2012, 2014
Kyrgyzstan Cup Winner (6): 2004, 2005, 2006, 2008, 2010, 2012, 2014
Kyrgyzstan Super Cup Winner (3): 2011, 2012, 2013, 2014
AFC President's Cup Winner (2): 2006, 2007

References

External links

1980 births
Living people
Kyrgyzstani footballers
Kyrgyzstan international footballers
FC Dordoi Bishkek players
Association football defenders